Bernnadette Stanis, also billed as Bern Nadette Stanis (born Bernadette Stanislaus, December 22, 1953), is an American actress and author. Stanis is best known for her role as Thelma Evans, the only daughter of Florida and James Evans Sr. on the CBS sitcom Good Times which originally ran from 1974 to 1979. Stanis is the author of four books: Situations 101: Relationships, The Good, The Bad & The Ugly; For Men Only; Situations 101: Finances; and The Last Night.

Early life 

One of five children, Stanis was born and raised in the Brownsville section of Brooklyn, New York City. Her paternal grandparents were from Carriacou in the Grenadine Islands. She attended Erasmus Hall High School and later attended the Juilliard School. As a teen, Stanis entered Miss Black America pageants, and went on to become Miss Brooklyn, a title with which she became first runner-up in the Miss New York state pageant.

Career 
Stanis played the role of Thelma Ann Evans on the CBS sitcom Good Times from February 1974 to August 1979. After the series ended, she made appearances on television shows including The Cosby Show and What's Happening Now!!. She and former co-star Jimmie Walker lent their voices to a radio spot for AT&T, and Stanis went on to do a Nationwide Insurance commercial. Stanis has been featured in promotions for the TV One network, and in a "Thelma" promotion that aired September 19, 2009, alongside actress Anna Maria Horsford in the "Battle of the Thelmas" that aired their weddings from their respective TV series. (Horsford portrayed "Thelma Frye" in the TV series Amen.) During the "Way Black Then" promotions in February 2010 in honor of Black History Month, she and Walker appeared on the  program Color TV to share their memories and thoughts on Good Times. She later appeared on the TV One show Life After. In July 2016, Stanis appeared on an episode of Centric's Being, discussing her life and career.

Personal life 
Stanis has been married four times. Her first marriage was to high-school sweetheart Thomas Fauntleroy from June 1974 until 1978, then to Brooklyn nightclub owner Darnell Johnson in January 1979. Stanis' third marriage was to mechanical engineer Terrence Redd. Stanis gave birth to their daughter Dior Ravel circa April 1982. The couple later divorced. Her fourth husband is  Kevin Fontana; an article in 2012 said they had been married 31 years, but other sources (cited above) state that Stanis was married to Redd circa 1981. Stanis also has a second child, daughter Brittany Rose. Stanis currently lives in Atlanta, Georgia with her children.

Filmography

Television

Film

Music video

Bibliography

References

External links 
 

1953 births
African-American actresses
American television actresses
Juilliard School alumni
People from Brownsville, Brooklyn
20th-century African-American people
20th-century American actresses
Living people
Erasmus Hall High School alumni
20th-century African-American women
21st-century African-American people
21st-century African-American women